Iryna Volodymyrivna Lukianenko (born 13 September 1983) is a Ukrainian figure skating coach and former competitor. She won bronze medals at the 2001 Karl Schäfer Memorial, 2003 Skate Israel, and three Ukrainian Championships. She qualified for the free skate at the 2003 World Junior Championships in Ostrava and finished 23rd overall. She was coached by Natalia Butuzova in Kyiv.

Lukianenko coached in Kyiv from 2010 to 2013 and then relocated to Kryvyi Rih. Her student was Vladyslav Pikhovych, who was a member of the Ukrainian student national team and participated at the 2017 Winter Universiade.

Programs

Competitive highlights 
JGP: Junior Grand Prix

References

External links 
 

1983 births
Ukrainian female single skaters
Living people
Sportspeople from Kyiv
Competitors at the 2001 Winter Universiade
Competitors at the 2005 Winter Universiade